Ross Gunn (born 1 January 1997) is a British professional racing driver, and Aston Martin Racing works driver who currently competes in the IMSA SportsCar Championship.

Career

Gunn began his racing career in karting at the age of eight, winning the British Super One MiniMax Championship in 2011 before taking the British Super One Junior Rotax Championship title the following year. In 2013, he graduated to single-seater formula competition, competing in the BRDC Formula 4 series. However, he was forced to miss the final two rounds of the season due to a lack of funding. Scoring two race victories, Gunn finished 11th in the championship.

As a result of his lack of funding, Gunn wouldn't race competitively in 2014, but would return in 2015 by taking part in the Aston Martin Evolution Academy. That season, Gunn and co-driver Jamie Chadwick secured the British GT Championship GT4-class title, driving for Beechdean-AMR. In December, Gunn was announced as the winner of the Aston Martin Evolution Academy, which lead to his signing as an Aston Martin factory driver for 2016. After a year of GT3 competition in 2016, Gunn stepped up to the GTE ranks with Beechdean-AMR, competing in the 2017 European Le Mans Series. In 2019, Gunn secured his first full-time FIA World Endurance Championship ride with Aston Martin Racing's GTE Am class entry, driving alongside Paul Dalla Lana and Darren Turner. The team would collect four podium finishes in eight races, finishing 7th in the championship.

2021 saw Gunn join Aston Martin customer team Heart of Racing in the IMSA SportsCar Championship. Following the 12 Hours of Sebring, Gunn was confirmed as the full-season partner for Roman de Angelis, with team boss Ian James set to step back to the series' endurance events at Watkins Glen and Road Atlanta. That season, the duo claimed the WeatherTech Sprint Cup title, awarded to the highest performing team throughout the season's sprint events. Gunn was victorious in the final race of the season at Petit Le Mans, held at Road Atlanta. 2022 saw Gunn join the team's GTD Pro class entry, paired for the season with Alex Riberas. After a difficult start to the season, featuring retirements at both Daytona and Sebring, the duo scored class victories at Long Beach and Watkins Glen, rebounding to finish fourth in the GTD Pro championship. Gunn returned to the team for the following season.

In 2023, Gunn returned to the British GT Championship, reuniting with Andrew Howard and the Beechdean AMR team. He would make it three full-time programs for 2023 following the announcement of TRG's GT World Challenge America entry, where he partnered with Derek DeBoer. As the team's factory representative, Gunn primarily played the role of initially bringing the team to terms with the Aston Martin Vantage AMR GT3 and coaching DeBoer. Furthermore, he cited his IMSA factory drive as taking the highest priority, as his three-pronged program encountered several conflicting race dates.

Racing record

Career summary

* Season still in progress.

Complete WeatherTech SportsCar Championship results
(key) (Races in bold indicate pole position)

* Season still in progress.

Complete FIA World Endurance Championship results
(key) (Races in bold indicate pole position; races in italics indicate fastest lap)

Complete 24 Hours of Le Mans results

References

External links
Ross Gunn at Motorsport.com

1997 births
Living people
British racing drivers
British GT Championship drivers
European Le Mans Series drivers
Blancpain Endurance Series drivers
FIA World Endurance Championship drivers
24 Hours of Le Mans drivers
Asian Le Mans Series drivers
WeatherTech SportsCar Championship drivers
Aston Martin Racing drivers
Michelin Pilot Challenge drivers
24H Series drivers
Le Mans Cup drivers